Larry Mark (born August 8, 1985 in Ann Arbor, Michigan) is a former American soccer player.

Career

College
Mark attended DeMatha Catholic High School, and played his first two years of college soccer at Rutgers University before transferring to American University as a junior. He finished his Eagles career with 11 goals and 7 assists in 37 matches.

Professional
Mark turned professional with Crystal Palace Baltimore in the USL Second Division in 2007, and made his professional debut on May 5, 2007 as a substitute in a 1-0 loss to the Cincinnati Kings.

Career statistics
(correct as of September 26, 2010)

External links
 American University bio

References

1985 births
Living people
American Eagles men's soccer players
American soccer players
Crystal Palace Baltimore players
USL Second Division players
USSF Division 2 Professional League players
Soccer players from Michigan
Rutgers Scarlet Knights men's soccer players
Association football midfielders